The Government Equalities Office (GEO) is the unit of the British government with responsibility for social equality. The office has lead responsibility for gender equality within the UK government, together with a responsibility to provide advice on all other forms of equality (including age, race, sexual orientation and disability) to other UK government departments. The unit is based at the Cabinet Office. Prior to April 2019, the GEO was led concurrently by Cabinet Secretaries at the Home Office, DFID and DfE. The day-to-day responsibility for policy on these issues was not transferred to GEO when it was created. The Equalities Office currently leads the Discrimination Law Review, which developed the Equality Act 2010 that replaced previous anti-discrimination legislation. The current minister responsible for GEO is Kemi Badenoch, who also serves as Secretary of State for International Trade in the Rishi Sunak government.

Ministers

The Government Equalities Office Ministers are as follows:

Budget
The budget for the Equalities Office reached £76 million in 2010-11. Following the spending review this is set to decrease each year, to £47.1 million in 2014-15. The budget has continued to decrease year-on-year, with £16.7 million being allocated in 2019-20.

Governance
The GEO has had different forms over the years since its creation. It was created in October 2007 when the Women and Equality Unit, based within the Department for Communities and Local Government was converted into an independent department. Since that time it has had various ministerial sponsors and has been housed within several ministerial departments:

In November 2018, the GEO announced that the unit would move to be part of the Cabinet Office in April 2019.

The GEO's current director as of November 2018 is Hilary Spencer.

Controversies
In June 2011, it emerged that female staff at the Equalities Office received 7.7% more pay than males on average. The information came to light following a Freedom of Information request by MP Dominic Raab. The enquiry also revealed that almost two thirds of the department's 107 staff were female. Raab criticised the department for double standards, stating "It undermines the credibility of the equality and diversity agenda, if bureaucrats at the government equalities office are preaching about unequal representation and the pay gap, whilst practising reverse". The differences between the genders became marked from 2008 under the leadership of Harriet Harman with the pay gap almost doubling from that time and six out of seven new jobs going to women.

In an interview about her role, director Hilary Spencer said:

See also
 Minister for Women and Equalities
 Women and Equalities Committee

References

External links
 

 
Department for Digital, Culture, Media and Sport
2007 establishments in the United Kingdom